Ore 10: lezione di canto (Italian for "10 o'clock: singing lesson", also spelled as Ore dieci lezione di canto) is a 1955 Italian musical comedy film written and directed by Marino Girolami.

Cast 

 Claudio Villa: Claudio 
 Rosy Mazzacurati: Rosy Montefiori 
 Enio Girolami: Ennio 
 Giorgio Gandos: Giorgio 
 Pietro De Vico: Pietro 
 Silvio Bagolini: Silvio
 Janet Hug: Valeria
 Virgilio Riento: Beniamino 
 Arturo Bragaglia: Prof. Campanella 
 Franco Coop: Prof. Biraghi 
 Ernesto Almirante: Prof. Tapparelli 
 Pina Gallini: Professor of singing

References

External links

1955 musical comedy films
1955 films
Italian musical comedy films
Films directed by Marino Girolami
Italian high school films
Italian black-and-white films
1950s Italian films